Rolan Aleksandrovich Gusev (born 17 September 1977) is a Russian professional football coach and a former player who played as a midfielder. He is the manager of the Under-19 squad of CSKA Moscow.

Early life
Gusev was born on 17 September 1977 in Ashgabat, Turkmen Soviet Socialist Republic, Soviet Union but moved to Moscow at the age of 9. He attended the Dynamo Moscow football school.

Club career
Gusev played for Dynamo Moscow since 1997 and transferred to the city rivals CSKA Moscow in 2002. With CSKA he won two Russian championships, two Russian Cups and the UEFA Cup.

Coaching career 
In October 2021 it was announced that he was appointed to the management club of the Under-19 squad of CSKA Moscow.

International career
As of 1 January 2006 Gusev scored over 50 goals in his 200+ appearances in the Russian Premier League. He played 2 matches for Russia at Euro 2004.

Honors
UEFA Cup: 2005
Russian Premier League: 2003, 2005, 2006
Russian Premier League top scorer: 2002 (with Dmitri Kirichenko)
Russian Cup: 2002, 2005, 2006
Russian Super Cup: 2004, 2006, 2007
Best right midfielder of the Russian Premier League according to Sport-Express: 2002, 2003, 2004, 2005

References

External links
 Gusev at rusteam.permian.ru 
 Winter-break transfers 2009 
 

1977 births
Living people
Association football midfielders
Russian footballers
Russian expatriate footballers
Expatriate footballers in Ukraine
Russia under-21 international footballers
Russia international footballers
FC Dynamo Moscow players
PFC CSKA Moscow players
UEFA Cup winning players
UEFA Euro 2004 players
Sportspeople from Ashgabat
Russian Premier League players
Ukrainian Premier League players
FC Dnipro players
FC Arsenal Kyiv players
Russian people of Turkmenistan descent
Turkmenistan footballers
Russian expatriate sportspeople in Ukraine
Russian football managers